Turbopsebius is a genus of small-headed flies in the family Acroceridae. There are about four described species in Turbopsebius.

Species
These four species belong to the genus Turbopsebius:
 Turbopsebius brunnipennis (Sabrosky, 1948) c g
 Turbopsebius diligens (Osten Sacken, 1877) i c g b
 Turbopsebius gagatinus (Loew, 1866) c g
 Turbopsebius sulphuripes (Loew, 1869) i c g b
Data sources: i = ITIS, c = Catalogue of Life, g = GBIF, b = Bugguide.net

References

Further reading

 

Acroceridae
Articles created by Qbugbot
Taxa named by Carl Robert Osten-Sacken